Sop Pong, sometimes mistakenly spelled "Sappong", is a village and tambon (sub-district) of Pang Mapha District, in Mae Hong Son Province, Thailand. It had a population of 7,398 in 2005. The tambon contains eight villages.

Notable features

Temples 
Sop Pong has two Buddhist temples, at either end of the village, including a forest monk temple, called Wat Ming Muang. It also has a Christian church, a Chinese temple, and a Haw Chinese Muslim mosque in old Sop Pong.

Nature 
The Lang River runs through the town, and passes through Tham Lot Cave. Sop Pong has many other caves, with some prehistoric items. In 2015, The Man With The Iron Fists 2, released in April, had a mine scene filmed in Tham Lot Cave.

References 

Tambon of Mae Hong Son province
Populated places in Mae Hong Son province